"A Hundred Pounds of Clay" is a song written by Kay Rogers, Luther Dixon, and Bob Elgin and performed by Gene McDaniels.  
The song was produced by Snuff Garrett. Earl Palmer played drums on the song. The song appeared on McDaniels' 1961 album 100 Lbs. Of Clay!

Chart performance
The song reached No. 3 on the Billboard Hot 100 pop chart and No. 11 on the R&B chart in 1961.

Other versions
Craig Douglas's cover version went to #9 on the UK Singles Chart in 1961.
Dalida released a French version of the song in 1961 entitled "Avec Une Poignée De Terre".
Arthur Alexander released a version on his 1962 debut album for Dot Records You Better Move On.
The Impressions released a version on their 1967 album, The Fabulous Impressions.
Dickie Goodman sampled the song in his 1973 novelty song, "The Touchables In Brooklyn".
Gary Lucas released a version on his 1998 album, Busy Being Born.
The Belmonts released a version on their 2009 album, The Belmonts Anthology Vol. 1 Featuring A Hundred Pounds of Clay.
Dee Dee Sharp released a version on her It's Mashed Potato Time album, changing the lyrics to "two hundred pounds" and dedicating the song to Chubby Checker.
Enrique Guzman released a version in México, named "Cien kilos de barro" in 1962.

Song controversy
In the early 1960s, the BBC banned the song and wouldn't allow British radio stations to play it. The controversy arose not from the fact that it was a religious song, but because the censors interpreted the song as suggesting women were created simply to be sexual beings, and the BBC felt something that was considered blasphemous.

References

1961 songs
1961 singles
Songs written by Luther Dixon
Gene McDaniels songs
The Impressions songs
Dickie Goodman songs
Song recordings produced by Snuff Garrett
Liberty Records singles
Songs written by Bob Elgin